Chengmen Station is a metro station of Line 1 of the Fuzhou Metro. It is located at the intersection of Fuxia Road and Guihua Road, south of South 3rd-Ring Road in Cangshan District, Fuzhou, Fujian, China. It started operation on May 18, 2016.

References 

Railway stations in China opened in 2016
Fuzhou Metro stations